Steam power developed slowly over a period of several hundred years, progressing through expensive and fairly limited devices in the early 17th century, to useful pumps for mining in 1700, and then to Watt's improved steam engine designs in the late 18th century. It is these later designs, introduced just when the need for practical power was growing due to the Industrial Revolution, that truly made steam power commonplace.

Development phases

Early examples
1st century AD – Hero of Alexandria describes the Aeolipile, as an example of the power of heated air or water. The device consists of a rotating ball spun by steam jets; it produced little power and had no practical application, but is nevertheless the first known device moved by steam pressure. He also describes a way of transferring water from one vessel to another using pressure. The methods involved filling a bucket, the weight of which worked tackle to open temple doors, which were then closed again by a deadweight once the water in the bucket had been drawn out by a vacuum caused by cooling of the initial vessel.
 He claims it was built by Pope Sylvester II.
Late 15th century AD: Leonardo Da Vinci described the Architonnerre, a steam-powered cannon.

Development of a practical steam engine

The Newcomen Engine: Steam power in practice

Watt's engine

Improving power

  Earlier versions of the steam engine indicator were in use by 1851, though relatively unknown.

Steam turbines are made to 1,500 MW (2,000,000 hp) to generate electricity.

See also
 Steam engine
 Steam power during the Industrial Revolution
 Maritime timeline
 Timeline of heat engine technology

Notes

External links
The Growth of the Steam Engine
Alternative timeline: If electric generators & motors had preceded steam

Steam power
Steam power

ko:증기 기관#발전 과정